Lopatinsky (masculine), Lopatinskaya (feminine), or Lopatinskoye (neuter) may refer to:
Lopatinsky District, a district of Penza Oblast, Russia
Lopatinskaya, a rural locality (a village) in Arkhangelsk Oblast, Russia